Circus Fandango is a 1954 Norwegian drama film directed by Arne Skouen. It was entered into the 1954 Cannes Film Festival.

Cast
Arne Arnardo as Fandango, manager
Joachim Holst-Jensen as Papa, clown
Ilselil Larsen as Tove
Toralv Maurstad as Jannik
Adolf Bjerke as the doctor
Svein Byhring as the stable boy
Anita Ellingsen as the nurse
Turid Haaland as Carmen
Jørgen Henriksen as Stump
Arvid Nilssen as the carpenter
Aud Schønemann
Alberto Schtirbu as Harmandez
Tom Tellefsen as the director
Einar Vaage as Raskolnikov, master of the stables
Ottar Wicklund as Alfred

References

External links

1954 films
1950s Norwegian-language films
1954 drama films
Norwegian black-and-white films
Films directed by Arne Skouen
Norwegian drama films